"It's What I Do" is a song written by Tom Shapiro and Chuck Jones, and recorded by American country music singer Billy Dean.  It was released in January 1996 as the first single and title track from his album It's What I Do.  The song spent twenty weeks on the Hot Country Songs charts in 1996, peaking at number five.

Critical reception
Deborah Evans Price, of Billboard magazine reviewed the song favorably, saying that the song "boasts a pretty melody and a solid romantic lyric that Dean delivers with warmth and conviction." She goes on to say that the song contains "no immediate bells and whistles, but it gains strength with repeated listening."

Music video
The music video was directed by Martin Kahan and premiered in January 1996.

Chart positions
"It's What I Do" debuted at number 70 on the U.S. Billboard Hot Country Singles & Tracks for the week of February 3, 1996.

Year-end charts

References

1996 singles
Billy Dean songs
Songs written by Chuck Jones (songwriter)
Songs written by Tom Shapiro
Song recordings produced by Tom Shapiro
Capitol Records Nashville singles
1996 songs